Marco Lusini (Siena 8 September 1936 - Florence 3 October 1989) was an Italian artist who worked in painting, sculpture, photography, and poetry. Born in Siena, he attended art school before relocating to Florence in 1960. Here, he involved himself in the "Bazzechi" photographic studio before becoming well known as a painter. He actively contributed to the city's cultural life, thereby becoming a friend and collaborator to such writers and poets as Mario Luzi, Alessandro Parronchi, Elvio Natali, Piero Santi, Elio Filippo Accrocca, Enzo Carli, Alfonso Gatto, Giulio Guberti, Franco Solmi, Carlo Segala, and Claudio Spadoni. He achieved fame throughout Italy and internationally.

Italian poet Mario Luzi opined that the "intense figurations of extraneousness and undeception" of Lusini's earlier work allowed the viewer to "let us know him". Luzi contrasted this with some of Lusini's later work, which he thought carried with it "a new utmost feeling of expectation and perhaps even something more... the very acute sense of the imminence of a final event".

The art critic Elvio Natali noted that the "one unfailing subject" which recurred throughout Lusini's work was "The human image, whether it is a woman's image or a man's image, often asexual, as a symbol of a common, undifferentiated destiny." He nevertheless noted that Lusini's work went through several cycles, among them "Lovers", "Mysterious figures", "Homage to Brecht", "Object Woman", and "Oneiric Landscapes".

In 1978, Lusini exhibited his work in Miami, Florida.
Following Lusini's death, Gerhard Gruitrooy devoted his paper on Giovanni Battista Naldini to Lusini's memory in volume seventeen of The J. Paul Getty Museum Journal.

References

Sources

Further reading
Catalogues of the Instituto D'Arte Tedesco Germanico per l’Arte Italiana del Novecento-Kunsthistorisches Institut, Florence
Catalogo Nazionale Bolaffi d'Arte Moderna volumes 12, 13, 14, 15 and 16
Catalogo "Bolaffi" Grafica numbers 8, 9, and 10.
"Giornale del Mattino" (19.06.1964): La figura di Lusini – Alessandro Parronchi (1972) Presentazione alla Mostra nel Castello dei Conti Guidi, Città di Vinci (Firenze)
"L'Unità" (20.10.1972): Le figure di Lusini, Mostra nel Castello dei Conti Guidi, Città di Vinci
"La Nazione" (Aprile 1972 ) - "Il Giornale d'Italia" (10.02.1973) – Alessandro Parronchi (03.02.1973): Per la Mostra di Verona -  "Il Gazzettino di Verona (Febbraio 1973) 
"In Galleria" a cura di Piero Santi – Mario Luzi (1980) Presentazione – Enzo Carli: Testimonianza per Marco Lusini (Settembre 1981) 
Elvio Natali, "Corriere delle Arti" (Dicembre 1981): I Paesaggi fantastici di Marco Lusini 
Riccardo Belloni: Lusini è un Astronauta, “Corriere di Romagna” (28.11.1981) – 
Enzo Carli, “Il Nuovo Ravennate” (Novembre 1981).
M.V.: Un ricordo del pittore senese Marco Lusini: Nell’arte la sua passione per la vita,  “La Nazione” (01.10.1992)

External links
 Enciclopedia Treccani

Italian artists
People from Siena
1936 births
1989 deaths